This is a list of 252 species in Crossocerus, a genus of square-headed wasps in the family Crabronidae.

Crossocerus species

 Crossocerus acanthophorus (Kohl, 1892) i c g
 Crossocerus acephalus Leclercq, 1958 i c g
 Crossocerus adhaesus (Kohl, 1915) i c g
 Crossocerus aeta Pate, 1944 i c g
 Crossocerus alticola Tsuneki, 1968 i c g
 Crossocerus amurensis (Kohl, 1892) i c g
 Crossocerus angelicus (Kincaid, 1900) i c g
 Crossocerus angolae Leclercq, 2008 i c g
 Crossocerus angulifemur Leclercq and Miller in Leclerq, 2000 i c g
 Crossocerus annandali (Bingham, 1908) i c g
 Crossocerus annulipes (Lepeletier de Saint Fargeau and Brullé, 1835) i c g
 Crossocerus antropovi Schmid-Egger, 2011 i c g
 Crossocerus aponis Tsuneki, 1984 i c g
 Crossocerus aposanus Tsuneki, 1984 i c g
 Crossocerus arcorum Leclercq c g
 Crossocerus ardens (Cameron, 1890) i c g
 Crossocerus ariminensis Terayama and Murota, 2016 i g
 Crossocerus arnoldi Leclercq and Miller in Leclerq, 2000 i c g
 Crossocerus assamensis (Cameron, 1902) i c g
 Crossocerus assimilis (F. Smith, 1856) i c g
 Crossocerus aswad (Nurse, 1902) i c g
 Crossocerus bajaensis Leclercq and Miller in Leclerq, 2000 i c g
 Crossocerus barbipes (Dahlbom, 1845) i c g
 Crossocerus binicarinalis Li and Wu, 2003 i c g
 Crossocerus binotatus Lepeletier de Saint Fargeau and Brullé, 1835 i c g
 Crossocerus bispinosus de Beaumont, 1967 i c g
 Crossocerus bnun Tsuneki, 1971 i c g
 Crossocerus boharti Leclercq and Miller in Leclerq, 2000 i c g
 Crossocerus brahmanus Leclercq, 1956 i c g
 Crossocerus breviclypeatus Tsuneki, 1977 i c g
 Crossocerus brooksi Leclercq and Miller in Leclerq, 2000 i c g
 Crossocerus brunniventris (Arnold, 1932) i c g
 Crossocerus bukavu Leclercq, 2008 i c g
 Crossocerus bulawayoensis (Arnold, 1932) i c g
 Crossocerus burungaensis (Arnold, 1934) i c g
 Crossocerus callani Pate, 1941 i c g
 Crossocerus cameroni Leclercq and Miller in Leclerq, 2000 i c g
 Crossocerus capax Leclercq, 2008 i c g
 Crossocerus capitalis Leclercq, 1958 i c g
 Crossocerus capitosus (Shuckard, 1837) i c g
 Crossocerus carinicollaris Li and Wu, 2006 i c g
 Crossocerus cetratus (Shuckard, 1837) i c g
 Crossocerus chiapensis Leclercq and Miller in Leclerq, 2000 i c g
 Crossocerus chromatipus Pate, 1944 i c g
 Crossocerus cinxius (Dahlbom, 1839) i c g
 Crossocerus congener (Dahlbom, 1844) i c g
 Crossocerus decorosus Leclercq and Miller in Leclerq, 2000 i c g
 Crossocerus decorus (W. Fox, 1895) i c g
 Crossocerus denticoxa (Bischoff, 1932) i c g
 Crossocerus denticrus Herrich-Schaeffer, 1841 i c g
 Crossocerus dimidiatus (Fabricius, 1781) i c g
 Crossocerus distinguendus (A. Morawitz, 1866) i c g
 Crossocerus distortus Leclercq, 1955 i c g
 Crossocerus domicola Tsuneki, 1971 i c g
 Crossocerus elongatulus (Vander Linden, 1829) i c g
 Crossocerus emarginatus (Kohl, 1899) i c g
 Crossocerus emirorum Leclercq, 1998 i c g
 Crossocerus epiri Leclercq, 2007 i c g
 Crossocerus eques (Nurse, 1902) i c g
 Crossocerus eriogoni (Rohwer, 1908) i c g
 Crossocerus esau de Beaumont, 1967 i c g
 Crossocerus evansi Leclercq and Miller in Leclerq, 2000 i c g
 Crossocerus exdentatus Li and L.F. Yang, 2002 i c g
 Crossocerus exiguus (Vander Linden, 1829) i c g
 Crossocerus fabreorum Leclercq and Terzo, 2007 i c g
 Crossocerus federationis Leclercq, 1961 i c g
 Crossocerus fergusoni Pate, 1944 i c g
 Crossocerus flavissimus Leclercq, 1973 i c g
 Crossocerus flavitarsus (Tsuneki, 1947) i c g
 Crossocerus flavomaculatus Li and He, 2005 i c g
 Crossocerus flavopictus (F. Smith, 1856) i c g
 Crossocerus floresus Leclercq, 1978 i c g
 Crossocerus fossuleus Leclercq, 1958 i c g
 Crossocerus foxi Leclercq and Miller in Leclerq, 2000 i c g
 Crossocerus fukuiensis Tsuneki, 1970 i c g
 Crossocerus gaboni Leclercq, 2008 i c g
 Crossocerus gemblacensis Leclercq, 1968 i c g
 Crossocerus gerardi Leclercq, 1956 i c g
 Crossocerus glabricornis (Arnold, 1926) i c g
 Crossocerus guerrerensis (Cameron, 1891) i c g
 Crossocerus guichardi Leclercq, 1972 i c g
 Crossocerus hakusanus Tsuneki, 1954 i c g
 Crossocerus harringtonii (W. Fox, 1895) i c g
 Crossocerus hasalakae Leclercq, 1986 i c g
 Crossocerus heinrichi Leclercq, 1974 i c g
 Crossocerus hewitti (Cameron, 1908) c g
 Crossocerus heydeni Kohl, 1880 i c g
 Crossocerus hingstoni Leclercq, 1950 i c g
 Crossocerus hirashimai Tsuneki, 1966 i c g
 Crossocerus hirtitibia (Arnold, 1945) i c g
 Crossocerus hiurai Tsuneki, 1966 i c g
 Crossocerus hospitalis Leclercq, 1961 i c g
 Crossocerus impressifrons (F. Smith, 1856) i c g b
 Crossocerus indonesiae Leclercq, 1961 i c g
 Crossocerus insolens (W. Fox, 1895) i c g
 Crossocerus inundatiflavus Li and He, 2004 i c g
 Crossocerus italicus de Beaumont, 1959 i c g
 Crossocerus jason (Cameron, 1891) i c g
 Crossocerus jasonoides Leclercq, 2000 i c g
 Crossocerus jubilans (Kohl, 1915) i c g
 Crossocerus kamateensis Tsuneki, 1971 i c g
 Crossocerus klapperichi de Beaumont, 1963 i c g
 Crossocerus kockensis Leclercq, 1950 i c g
 Crossocerus kohli (Bischoff, 1921) i c g
 Crossocerus krombeini Leclercq and Miller in Leclerq, 2000 i c g
 Crossocerus kurczewskii Leclercq and Miller in Leclerq, 2000 i c g
 Crossocerus larutae Leclercq, 1961 i c g
 Crossocerus lentus (W. Fox, 1895) i c g
 Crossocerus leucostoma (Linnaeus, 1758) i c g
 Crossocerus lindbergi (de Beaumont, 1954) i c g
 Crossocerus lipatus Leclercq, 1961 i c g
 Crossocerus lippensi Leclercq, 1958 i c g
 Crossocerus liqiangi Leclercq, 2009 c g
 Crossocerus liquiangi Leclercq, 2009 i c g
 Crossocerus lokojae Leclercq, 2008 i c g
 Crossocerus lundbladi (Kjellander, 1954) i c g
 Crossocerus maculiclypeus (W. Fox, 1895) i c g
 Crossocerus maculipennis (F. Smith, 1856) i c g
 Crossocerus maculitarsis (Cameron, 1891) i c g
 Crossocerus magniceps Tsuneki, 1977 i c g
 Crossocerus malaisei (Gussakovskij, 1932) i c g
 Crossocerus medidentatus Li and Wu, 2003 i c g
 Crossocerus megacephalus (Rossi, 1790) i c g
 Crossocerus melanius (Rohwer, 1911) i c g
 Crossocerus melanochilos Pate, 1944 i c g
 Crossocerus mexicanus Leclercq and Miller in Leclerq, 2000 i c g
 Crossocerus micemarginatus Li and He, 2004 i c g
 Crossocerus microcollaris (Li and He, 2001) i c g
 Crossocerus micromegas (de Saussure, 1892) i c g
 Crossocerus miellati Leclercq, 1961 i c g
 Crossocerus minamikawai Tsuneki, 1966 i c g
 Crossocerus mindanaonis Tsuneki, 1984 i c g
 Crossocerus minimus (Packard, 1867) i c g
 Crossocerus minor Tsuneki, 1990 i c g
 Crossocerus minotaurus Leclercq, 2009 i c g
 Crossocerus minutulus (Arnold, 1944) i c g
 Crossocerus morawitzi (Gussakovskij, 1952) i c g
 Crossocerus mukalanae Leclercq, 1986 i c g
 Crossocerus neimongolensis Li and L.F. Yang, 2002 i c g
 Crossocerus nemeci Ríha, 2008 i c g
 Crossocerus nigritus (Lepeletier de Saint Fargeau and Brullé, 1835) i c g
 Crossocerus nikkoensis Tsuneki and Tanaka, 1955 i c g
 Crossocerus nitidicorpus Tsuneki, 1968 i c g
 Crossocerus nitidiventris (W. Fox, 1892) i c g b
 Crossocerus noonadanus Tsuneki, 1976 i c g
 Crossocerus odontochilus Li and Yang, 1995 i c g
 Crossocerus onoi (Yasumatsu, 1939) i c g
 Crossocerus opacifrons (Tsuneki, 1947) i c g
 Crossocerus ornatipes (R. Turner, 1918) i c g
 Crossocerus ovalis Lepeletier de Saint Fargeau and Brullé, 1835 i c g
 Crossocerus ovchinnikovi Kazenas, 2007 i c g
 Crossocerus pakistanus Leclercq, 2009 i c g
 Crossocerus palmipes (Linnaeus, 1767) i c g
 Crossocerus parcorum Leclercq, 1958 i c g
 Crossocerus patei Leclercq and Miller in Leclerq, 2000 i c g
 Crossocerus pazensis Leclercq, 2000 i c g
 Crossocerus peckorum Leclercq, 2000 i c g
 Crossocerus perpolitus Leclercq, 1978 i c g
 Crossocerus perpusillus (Walker, 1871) i c g
 Crossocerus phaeochilos Pate, 1944 i c g
 Crossocerus pignatus Leclercq, 1968 i c g
 Crossocerus planifemur Krombein, 1952 i c g
 Crossocerus pleuracutus Leclercq, 1973 i c g
 Crossocerus pleuralis Leclercq and Miller in Leclerq, 2000 i c g
 Crossocerus pleuralituberculi Li and He, 2004 i c g
 Crossocerus podagricus (Vander Linden, 1829) i c g
 Crossocerus porexus Leclercq, 1968 i c g
 Crossocerus pseudochromatipus Leclercq and Miller in Leclerq, 2000 i c g
 Crossocerus pseudomexicanus Leclercq and Miller in Leclerq, 2000 i c g
 Crossocerus pseudopalmarius (Gussakovskij, 1932) i c g
 Crossocerus pueblensis Leclercq, 2000 i c g
 Crossocerus puertagarnicae Leclercq and Miller in Leclerq, 2000 i c g
 Crossocerus pullulus (A. Morawitz, 1866) i c g
 Crossocerus punctivertex Leclercq and Miller in Leclerq, 2000 i c g
 Crossocerus pusanoides Leclercq, 1963 i c g
 Crossocerus pusanus Leclercq, 1956 i c g
 Crossocerus pyrrhus Leclercq, 1956 i c g
 Crossocerus quadrimaculatus (Fabricius, 1793) i c g
 Crossocerus quinlani Leclercq, 1989 i c g
 Crossocerus quinquedentatus Tsuneki, 1971 i c g
 Crossocerus rasnitsyni Kazenas, 2011 i c g
 Crossocerus raui Rohwer, 1923 i c g
 Crossocerus rectangularis (Gussakovskij, 1952) i c g
 Crossocerus repositus (Arnold, 1944) i c g
 Crossocerus rimatus Leclercq, 1963 i c g
 Crossocerus riparius (Arnold, 1926) i c g
 Crossocerus ruandensis (Arnold, 1932) i c g
 Crossocerus rubromaculatus Tsuneki, 1982 i c g
 Crossocerus rudipunctatus Li and Wu, 2006 i c g
 Crossocerus rufiventris Tsuneki, 1968 i c g
 Crossocerus rugosilateralis Li and Yang, 2003 i c g
 Crossocerus ruwenzoriensis (Arnold, 1926) i c g
 Crossocerus sabahensis Leclercq, 1974 i c g
 Crossocerus sauteri Tsuneki, 1977 i c g
 Crossocerus sciaphillus Leclercq, 1961 i c g
 Crossocerus segregatus Leclercq, 1958 i c g
 Crossocerus senonus Leclercq, 1961 i c g
 Crossocerus shibuyai (Iwata, 1934) i c g
 Crossocerus shirakii Tsuneki, 1986 i c g
 Crossocerus similis (W. Fox, 1895) i c g
 Crossocerus simlaensis (Nurse, 1902) i c g
 Crossocerus sinicus Leclercq, 1954 i c g
 Crossocerus slimmatus Leclercq, 1963 i c g
 Crossocerus sotirus Leclercq, 1963 i c g
 Crossocerus spinigeroides Leclercq and Miller in Leclerq, 2000 i c g
 Crossocerus spinigerus (Cameron, 1904) i c g
 Crossocerus stangei Leclercq, 2000 i c g
 Crossocerus stictochilos Pate, 1944 i c g
 Crossocerus strangulatus (Bischoff, 1930) i c g
 Crossocerus stricklandi Pate, 1944 i c g
 Crossocerus styrius (Kohl, 1892) i c g
 Crossocerus subulatus (Dahlbom, 1845) i c g
 Crossocerus sulcatus Li and Fang, 2003 i c g
 Crossocerus surusumi Tsuneki, 1971 i c g
 Crossocerus suzukii (Matsumura, 1912) i c g
 Crossocerus taiwanus Tsuneki, 1968 i c g
 Crossocerus takasago Tsuneki, 1966 i c g
 Crossocerus takeuchii Tsuneki and Tanaka, 1955 i c g
 Crossocerus tanakai Tsuneki, 1954 i c g
 Crossocerus tanoi Tsuneki, 1968 i c g
 Crossocerus tarsalis (W. Fox, 1895) i c g
 Crossocerus tarsatus (Shuckard, 1837) i c g
 Crossocerus taru de Beaumont, 1967 i c g
 Crossocerus taxus Leclercq, 1956 i c g
 Crossocerus toledensis Leclercq, 1971 i c g
 Crossocerus tolucae Leclercq, 2000 i c g
 Crossocerus topilego Leclercq and Miller in Leclerq, 2000 i c g
 Crossocerus traductor (Nurse, 1902) i c g
 Crossocerus tropicalis (Arnold, 1947) i c g
 Crossocerus trucidus Leclercq, 1974 i c g
 Crossocerus tsuifengensis Tsuneki, 1968 i c g
 Crossocerus tsunekii Leclercq and Miller in Leclerq, 2000 i c g
 Crossocerus turneri (Arnold, 1927) i c g
 Crossocerus tyuzendzianus Tsuneki, 1954 i c g
 Crossocerus uchidai (Tsuneki, 1947) i c g
 Crossocerus unicus (Patton, 1879) i c g
 Crossocerus unidentatus Li and L. Yang, 2001 i c g
 Crossocerus upembae Leclercq, 2008 i c g
 Crossocerus ursidus Leclercq, 1956 i c g
 Crossocerus vagabundus (Panzer, 1798) i c g
 Crossocerus varus Lepeletier de Saint Fargeau and Brullé, 1835 i c g
 Crossocerus vepectineus Li and He, 2004 i c g
 Crossocerus viennensis Leclercq, 1968 i c g
 Crossocerus walkeri (Shuckard, 1837) i c g
 Crossocerus weeratungei Leclercq, 1986 i c g
 Crossocerus wesmaeli (Vander Linden, 1829) i c g
 Crossocerus xanthochilos Pate, 1944 i c g
 Crossocerus xanthognathus (Rohwer, 1911) i c g
 Crossocerus xizangensis Li and L. Yang, 2001 i c g
 Crossocerus yanoi (Tsuneki, 1947) i c g
 Crossocerus yasumatsui (Tsuneki, 1947) i c g
 Crossocerus yerburii (Cameron, 1898) i c g

Data sources: i = ITIS, c = Catalogue of Life, g = GBIF, b = Bugguide.net

References

Crossocerus